Parviz Kimiavi (born 1939, in Tehran) is an Iranian (Persian) film director, screenwriter, editor and one of the most prominent figures of Persian cinema of the 20th century.

Kimiavi studied photography and film at l'École Louis Lumière (Louis Lumiere School of Cinematography) and IDHEC. His works gained critical success and won several prizes in important international events such as Berlin and Cannes.

Filmography: Directing
The Old Man and His Stone Garden (Piremard va bagh-e sangi'ash, 2004)
Iran Is My Homeland (Iran sara-ye man ast, 1999)
Simone Weil (1988) (TV)
Zourkhaneh: The House of Strength (Zourkhaneh: La maison de force, 1988) (TV)
Blue Jeans (Blue jean, Le, 1984) (TV)
Oswaldo Rodriguez (1983) (TV)
Portrait of a Tunisian Boy (Portrait d'un jeune Tunisien, 1982) (TV)
The Trench (Tranche, La, 1981) (TV)
OK Mister! (1979)
The Garden of Stones (Bagh-e Sangi, 1976)
The Mongols (Mogholha, 1973)
P Like Pelican (P mesle pelican, 1972)
Gowharshad Mosque (Masjed-e gowharshad, 1971)
Mashhad's Bazaar (Bazar-e mashhad, 1970)
From Bojnurd to Quchan (Bojnurd ta quchan, 1970)
Shiraz 70 (Shiraz-e 70, 1970)
Oh Guardian of Deers (Ya zamen-e ahu, 1970)
The Hills of Qaytariyeh (Tappehaye qaytariyeh, 1969)

Awards and honours
Silver Bear: 26th Berlin International Film Festival (1976 - The Garden of Stones (Bagh-e Sangi))

References

External links

1939 births
Living people
Iranian film directors
Persian-language film directors
People from Tehran